The Centre for Development of Telematics (C-DOT) is an Indian Government owned telecommunications technology development centre. It was established in 1984 with initial mandate of designing and developing digital exchanges. C-DOT has expanded to develop intelligent computer software applications. It has offices in Delhi, Bangalore and Kolkata. It is one of the few government organisations in India which have been appraised at Maturity Level 5 of CMMI-DEV v1.3.

In February 2014, United Telecoms Limited the technology licensee of CDOT had won GPON order from BBNL to a value of Rs 1000 Cr approximately. This is the biggest win by any CDOT partner in global competitive bidding in recent years. For the same project National Optical Fibre Network C-DOT won the NMS tender. CDOT has contributed significantly in telecom sector and it is known as temple of technology in India.

Presently CDOT is implementing Common Alert Protocol for India by developing Location based Integrated Disaster Early Warning System for National Disaster Management Authority. In this project, Forecasting agencies like IMD, CWC, INCOIS, GSI, SASE and national to state level disaster management authorities in a common platform for dissemination of early warnings for cyclone, flood, thunderstorms, sandstorm, tsunami, landslides and Avalanche to public over multiple media like mobile, internet, TV, radio, social media etc. With completion of the project, it will not only save precious human lives but also take make the country disaster resilient.

History
The Centre for Development of Telematics was established in August 1984 as an autonomous body. Its goal was to develop telecommunication technology to meet the needs of the Indian telecommunication network.

Sam Pitroda started the C-DOT as an autonomous telecom R&D organisation.
In the initial years, a telecom revolution in rural India that was responsible for all-round socio-economic development from global connectivity. As part of its development process, C-DOT spawned equipment manufacturers and component vendors. Research and development facilities were located at its Delhi and Bangalore campuses.

Within a short time, telecom switching products suited to Indian conditions appeared in the form of small rural automatic exchanges (RAXs) and medium size switches as SBMs for towns. This was followed by higher capacity digital switches known as main automatic exchanges (MAXs). C-DOT technology spread across the country through its licensed manufacturers..

Beginning with digital switching systems, C-DOT developed products for optical, satellite and wireless communication from circuit switching technology, ATM and next generation networks. From a purely hardware development centre, it diversified into development of telecom software like IN, NMS, Data Clearing House and from a protected environment of closed market to an open and competitive market.

While developing the RAX/MAX digital switches, C-DOT also evolved processes and procedures for manufacturing the switches in Indian factories which set up an Indian manufacturing vendor base. Later, C-DOT projects included central monitoring systems for telecom security, for the Indian government.

Presently C-DOT is implementing Common Alerting Protocol (CAP) in India to send out early warnings to the public through mobiles. CAP enables dissemination of messages to the target population without the intervention of service providers. The State of Kerala has used the platform effectively to send out as many as 11.4 lakhs precautionary messages during the Floods. Kerala used it again when Cyclone Gaja crossed over Kerala.

C-DOT has developed Fibre Fault Localization System(FFLS) which detects and locate the fibre fault along with fault location on GIS map.

C-DOT's role in Surveillance
In 2014, the non-profit group Reporters without Borders published their annual report on countries which are "Enemies of the Internet and/or under surveillance", in which India was labelled as a country with widespread ongoing governmental surveillance of its citizens with little oversight. C-DOT was among the international agencies listed with a mandate of surveillance of Indian citizens and other network traffic within India.C-DOT is working on the project called CMS, which is similar to the PRISM project of the NSA.

Products
RAX : Rural Automatic Exchange is a small 256 lines switch for landlines that helped spread telecom to rural parts of India
MAX : Main automatic exchange
Transmission Equipment
TDMA Point to Multipoint Radio
GPON
DWDM
SGRAN 
 LTE-A 
 Softswitch
 NGN
 Router
 BBWT
 Intelligent Networks
 Satellite Wifi
 Interoperable Set Top Box
 XGSPON
 LMG

Software
 CAP compliant Location Based Disaster Early Warning System
Network management systems
[CDOT'S Common Service Platform] for M2M applications
EMS
 [Fibre Fault Localisation System]
[Tele-Plannet]- GIS based OFC Network Planner.
Intelligent networks

Joint ventures
C-DOT Alcatel Lucent Research Center(CARC)
 United Telecoms Limited
Vanu, Inc.
Communications Research Centre (CRC)
XALTED Information Systems Private Ltd.

See also
Telematics

References

External links
 C-DOT Official Website
 C-DOT Alcatel Lucent Research Centre
Brief History of C-DOT
CMMI-DEV v1.3 ML5 appraisal details

 Disaster Warning Demo in Odisha

 ITU GET-2019

 Government develops Common Alerting Protocol to warn people about impending thunderstorm. 

Thunderstorm and Cyclone alert to your phone
Pilot test of CDOT'S CAP platform successfully held in Himachal Pradesh
Use of CDOT's CAP Platform during Kerala Flood
Yellow Warning in 8 district of Kerala through CDOT's CAP Platform
Pilot testing of CDOT'S CAP Platform in Uttarakhand

Ministry of Communications and Information Technology (India)
Information technology in India
1984 establishments in Delhi
Research institutes established in 1984
Government agencies established in 1984
Telecommunications in India
Cyber Security in India